This is a list of lighthouses in The Gambia.

Lighthouses

See also
 Lists of lighthouses and lightvessels

References

External links

Gambia
Lighthouses
Lighthouses